The University of Michigan-Dearborn Fieldhouse is a multi-purpose arena/athletic facility located in Dearborn, Michigan on the campus of University of Michigan-Dearborn.

The facility houses a 2,500-seat multi-purpose gymnasium that is the home to the Michigan-Dearborn Men's and Women's basketball teams, and UMD Women's Volleyball team competing at the NAIA Division II level in the Wolverine–Hoosier Athletic Conference (WHAC).

The Fieldhouse also houses a 1,500-seat ice arena that serves as the home for Wolverines Men's Ice Hockey team competing at the ACHA Division I level in the NAIA Hockey Division and the Wolverine-Hoosier Athletic Conference.

The fieldhouse is also used for recreation and Intramural sports.

References

External links
 University of Michigan-Dearborn athletics website: UMD Wolves

Fieldhouse
Sports venues in Wayne County, Michigan
Indoor arenas in Michigan
Indoor ice hockey venues in Michigan
College ice hockey venues in the United States
Buildings and structures in Dearborn, Michigan